Eric Striker (born October 1, 1993) is a professional Canadian football defensive lineman who is currently a free agent. He played college football at Oklahoma.

Early years
Striker grew up in Tampa, Florida and attended Armwood High School, where he played football, baseball and ran track. In football, he set the school-record for career sacks with 42. As a junior in 2010, he made 125 tackles and 16 sacks. In his senior year, he racked up 109 tackles, 11 sacks and 18 tackles for loss, and earned Sports Illustrated first team All-American honors. He was rated as a four-star recruit by Rivals and 247sports, and a three-star by ESPN and Scout.

College career

Freshman season
In his final season at Armwood, Striker accepted a scholarship from Bob Stoops to play for the Oklahoma Sooners. As a freshman in 2012, he played in all 13 games, but only recorded stats in the game against the Kansas Jayhawks, making six tackles.

Sophomore season
As a sophomore, Striker earned a starting position and started every game. In a loss to rival Texas, he made a career-high seven tackles with a pass breakup and a tackle for loss. Against Kansas one week later, Striker got his first career sack, along with six tackles. At Oklahoma State in the annual Bedlam Series, he returned a fumble three yards for a touchdown on the final play of the game. In the final game of the year, Striker helped Oklahoma upset Alabama in the 2014 Sugar Bowl, recording a career-high three sacks and tying a career-high seven tackles. In the final minute of the game, he also got the first forced fumble of his career when he stripped Bama's quarterback, A. J. McCarron, followed by defensive end Geneo Grissom picking it up and running it in for a touchdown to seal the Sooners' victory.

Senior season
During his senior season, Striker started all 13 games at outside linebacker. He tied a career-high in tackles with 12, three going for a loss, along with two sacks and a forced fumble against West Virginia on October 10. On October 24, 2015, he recorded his first interception in his collegiate career in a home game against Texas Tech.  He caught the ball at the line of scrimmage and returned it inside the 5-yard-line. He recorded 6 tackles, three for a loss, against Clemson in the Orange Bowl.

Professional career

Buffalo Bills
On April 30, 2016, Striker was signed as an undrafted free agent by the Buffalo Bills. On August 30, 2016 Striker was waived by the Bills. In April 2017, Striker was hired by Oklahoma head coach Bob Stoops as the Sooners' Defensive Recruiting Analyst.

Saskatchewan Roughriders
Striker attended tryouts and mini-camp with the Saskatchewan Roughriders in Bradenton, Florida and was subsequently signed by the team in April 2018. He made the team and played in the first game of the season against the Toronto Argonauts and recorded two tackles. He only played in one game before being traded to the Argonauts on July 3, 2018.

References

1993 births
Living people
American football linebackers
Canadian football linebackers
Oklahoma Sooners football players
Players of American football from Tampa, Florida
Players of Canadian football from Tampa, Florida
Saskatchewan Roughriders players
Toronto Argonauts players
African-American players of Canadian football
African-American players of American football
21st-century African-American sportspeople